Loving is an unincorporated community in Young County, Texas, United States. It lies on State Highway 114 eighteen miles southeast of Olney in the northeastern part of the county. As of the 2000 Census, the population was estimated to be 300.

History 
Loving was founded in 1907 on land that was part of the Lost Valley Loving Ranch, owned by Oliver Loving who was the grandson of the famous cattle drover, Oliver Loving. The town was moved approximately one mile to the north in 1909  in order to be along the Gulf, Texas and Western Railroad. Trinity Townsite Company trustee B.B. Cain platted the new town on land purchased from the Steadham brothers, members of a local ranching family. Loving grew at a slow but steady pace throughout the early and middle part of the twentieth century and by 1930 possessed several churches, businesses as well as its own school, bank, and church. The population peaked at 350 in 1940, but subsequently declined to 240 by 1980 and maintained this level through the 1990 Census. According to the 2000 Census, however, this figure had increased significantly and Loving is now home to some 300 residents.

Education 
Loving's students are served by the Graham Independent School District.

References 

Unincorporated communities in Young County, Texas
Unincorporated communities in Texas